Age of Wonder may refer to:

 The Age of Wonder: How the Romantic Generation Discovered the Beauty and Terror of Science, 2008 biography book by Richard Holmes
 Age of Wonders, 1999 turn-based strategy video game and its sequels
 JLA: Age of Wonder, 2003 comic book mini-series
 Wonder Age, 2010 album by Air Dubai